Manacar is a 22-story skyscraper (Torre Manacar, "Manacar Tower") and shopping center in the Insurgentes Mixcoac neighborhood of southern Mexico City at the intersection of the city's north-south  artery, Avenida de los Insurgentes, and the Circuito Interior inner ring highway. It occupies the site of the former Cine Manacar cinema (1965–2013). The architect is the late Teodoro González de León. The total complex is 

The shopping center opened in July, 2017. There are 20 fashion stores, 7 restaurants, 20 food options and kiosks with a parking garage for 2700 cars on 11 levels. Anchors include Cinemex Premium, H&M, Forever 21, Massimo Dutti, Tommy Hilfiger, iShop/Mixup, Innovasport, Sephora, Sunglass Hut, Scappino, Benetton, Calzedonia and American Eagle Outfitters, while restaurants include Chili's.

External links
 Official website

References

Mixed-use developments in Mexico
Shopping malls in Greater Mexico City
Skyscrapers in Mexico City